A list of films produced in Hong Kong in 2008:.

2008

References

External links
 IMDB list of Hong Kong films
 Hong Kong films of 2008 at HKcinemamagic.com

2008
Hong Kong
2008 in Hong Kong